This is a list of the cattle breeds usually considered to have originated in Mexico. Some may have complex or obscure histories, so inclusion here does not necessarily imply that a breed is predominantly or exclusively Mexican.

References

 
Cattle